Pir Naim (also Romanized as Pīr Na‘īm; also known as Per Na‘īm) is a village in Kaseliyan Rural District, in the Central District of Savadkuh County, Mazandaran Province, Iran. At the 2006 census, its population was 251, in 64 families.

References 

Populated places in Savadkuh County